Nunataks, also called glacial islands, are exposed portions of ridges, mountains, or peaks not covered with ice or snow within (or at the edge of) an ice field or glacier. Nunataks present readily identifiable landmark reference points in glaciers or ice caps and are often named. The term is derived from the Inuit word, nunataq.

Antarctica

Enderby Land 
 The Cook Nunataks are a group of four nunataks at the northeast end of the Schwartz Range.

Graham Land 
It was discovered by Johan Gunnar Andersson's party of the Swedish Antarctic Expedition which wintered at Hope Bay in 1903.
Lincoln Nunatak  is a nunatak at the end of a ridge running westward from Mount Mangin on Adelaide Island.

Palmer Land

Aldebaran Rock
The Aldebaran Rock is a particularly conspicuous nunatak of bright red rock, located near the head of Bertram Glacier and 5 miles (8 km) northeast of Pegasus Mountains in western Palmer Land.

Anckorn Nunataks

Bergen Nunataks
They were named in 1977 by the Advisory Committee on Antarctic Names after Michael Bergen, a United States Antarctic Research Program engineer at Palmer Station, winter party 1970.

Olander Nunatak
Olander Nunatak is one of several somewhat scattered nunataks which rise above the ice of eastern Palmer Land, lying 5 nautical miles (9 km) east of Tollefson Nunatak and 27 nautical miles (50 km) north-northwest of Sky-Hi Nunataks.

Queen Maud Land

Bruns Nunataks
The name "Bruns-Berge", after Herbert Bruns, electrical engineer with the expedition, was applied in this area by the Third German Antarctic Expedition (1938–39) under Alfred Ritscher.

Tua Hill is an isolated rock hill 3 nautical miles (6 km) west of Brattskarvet Mountain in the Sverdrup Mountains, Queen Maud Land. Photographed from the air by the German Antarctic Expedition (1938–39). Mapped by Norwegian cartographers from surveys and air photos by Norwegian-British-Swedish Antarctic Expedition (NBSAE) (1949–52) and air photos by the Norwegian expedition (1958–59) and named Tua (the knoll).

Charles Nunataks
They were mapped by Norwegian cartographers from surveys and air photos by the Norwegian–British–Swedish Antarctic Expedition (NBSAE) (1949–52) and from air photos by the Norwegian expedition (1958–59), and named for Charles W. Swithinbank, glaciologist with NBSAE.

Dråpane Nunataks
The Dråpane Nunataks are nunataks north of Urnosa Spur, near the southwest end of the Kirwan Escarpment in Queen Maud Land. They were mapped by Norwegian cartographers from surveys and air photos by the NBSAE and additional air photos (1958–59), and named Dråpane (the drops).

Firlingane Nunataks
The Firlingane Nunataks() are four nunataks standing between Bulken Hill and Hesteskoen Nunatak in the Sør Rondane Mountains of Antarctica. They were mapped by Norwegian cartographers in 1957 from air photos taken by U.S. Navy Operation Highjump, 1946–47, and named Firlingane (the quadruplets).

Hamarskaftet Nunataks
They were mapped from surveys and air photos by the Sixth Norwegian Antarctic Expedition (1956–60) and named Hamarskaftet (the hammer handle).

Hemmestad Nunataks
They were plotted from air photos by the Third German Antarctic Expedition (1938–39), were mapped from surveys and air photos by the Sixth Norwegian Antarctic Expedition (1956–60) and named for Arne Hemmestad, a mechanic with the Norwegian expedition (1956–57).

Arne Nunatak (coordinates: 71°43′S 8°20′E) is the largest of the Hemmestad Nunataks. It is also named for Arne Hemmestad.

Henriksen Nunataks
They were plotted from air photos by the Third German Antarctic Expedition (1938–39), mapped from surveys and air photos by the Sixth Norwegian Antarctic Expedition (1956–60) and named for Hans-Martin Henriksen, a meteorological assistant with the latter expedition (1956–58).

Hettene Nunataks
The Hettene Nunataks (coordinates: 71°45′S 26°25′E) are a group of nunataks at the west side of Hette Glacier in the Sør Rondane Mountains of Antarctica. They were mapped by Norwegian cartographers in 1957 from air photos taken by U.S. Navy Operation Highjump, 1946–47, and named Hettene (the caps).

Holane Nunataks
They were mapped and named by Norwegian cartographers from surveys and air photos by the Norwegian–British–Swedish Antarctic Expedition (1949–52) and from air photos by the Norwegian expedition (1958–59).

Isrosene Nunataks
They were mapped by Norwegian cartographers in 1957 from air photos taken by U.S. Navy Operation Highjump, 1946–47, and named "Isrosene" (the ice roses).

Jare IV Nunataks
They were discovered on October 7, 1960, by the Belgian Antarctic Expedition under Guido Derom, and were named by Derom after the fourth Japanese Antarctic Research Expedition (JARE IV); in November–December 1960 a field party of the Japanese expedition reached this area and carried out geodetic and other scientific work.

Jarl Nunataks
They were mapped from surveys and air photos by the Sixth Norwegian Antarctic Expedition (1956–60) and named for Jarl Tonnesen, a meteorologist with the expedition (1956–58).

Knattebrauta Nunataks
They were photographed from the air by the Third German Antarctic Expedition (1938–39), mapped by Norwegian cartographers from surveys and air photos by the NBSAE and air photos by the Norwegian expedition (1958–59) and named Knattebrauta (the crag slope).

Kvassknatten Nunatak (coordinates: 72°27′S 0°20′E) is one of the Knattebrauta Nunataks. It was photographed from the air by the Third German Antarctic Expedition (1938–39). It was mapped by Norwegian cartographers from surveys and air photos by the NBSAE and air photos by the Norwegian expedition (1958–59) and named Kvassknatten (the sharp crag).

Litvillingane Rocks
They were mapped by Norwegian cartographers from surveys and air photos by the NBSAE and air photos by the Norwegian expedition (1958–59) and named Litvillingane (the mountainside twins).

Malyutki Nunataks
The feature was mapped by the Norsk Polarinstitutt from surveys and air photos by the Sixth Norwegian Antarctic Expedition, 1956–60. It was also mapped by the Soviet Antarctic Expedition in 1961 and named "Skaly Malyutki" (baby nunataks).

Nevskiye Nunataks
Nevskiye Nunataks (coordinates: 71°40′S 8°5′E) are a group of scattered nunataks comprising the Sørensen Nunataks and Hemmestad Nunataks in the Drygalski Mountains, Queen Maud Land. Mapped by Norsk Polarinstitutt from surveys and air photos by Norwegian Antarctic Expedition, 1956–60. Also mapped by the Soviet Antarctic Expedition in 1961; the name is an adjective derived from Neva, a river in the Soviet Union.

Onezhskiye Nunataks
Onezhskiye Nunataks (coordinates: 71°35′S 7°3′E) is a small group of nunataks, situated 9 nautical miles (17 km) north-northeast of Slettefjellet in the Muhlig-Hofmann Mountains, Queen Maud Land. Mapped by Norsk Polarinstitutt from surveys and air photos by Norwegian Antarctic Expedition, 1956–60. Also mapped by Soviet Antarctic Expedition in 1961; the name is an adjective derived from Onega, a river in the Soviet Union.

Storkvarvsteinen Peak (coordinates: 71°36′S 7°4′E) is an isolated rock peak 8 nautical miles (15 km) northeast of Storkvarvet Mountain and the main group of the Muhlig-Hofmann Mountains. Plotted from surveys and air photos by the Norwegian Antarctic Expedition (1956–60) and named Storkvarvsteinen (the big round of logs rock).

Perlebandet Nunataks
Perlebandet Nunataks (coordinates: 71°56′S 23°3′E) is a linear group of nunataks 5 nautical miles (9 km) northwest of Tanngarden Peaks in the Sor Rondane Mountains. It was mapped by Norwegian cartographers in 1957 from aerial photos taken by U.S. Navy Operation Highjump, 1946–47, and named Perlebandet (the string of beads).

Pingvinane Nunataks
Pingvinane Nunataks (coordinates: 72°0′S 23°17′E) are a group of nunataks standing close north of Tanngarden Peaks in the Sor Rondane Mountains. Mapped by Norwegian cartographers in 1957 from air photos taken by U.S. Navy Operation Highjump, 1946–47, and named Pingvinane (the penguins).

Plogskaftet Nunataks
Plogskaftet Nunataks (coordinates: 71°48′S 5°12′E) are a row of nunataks about 5 nautical miles (9 km) long lying close northwest of Cumulus Mountain in the Muhlig-Hofmann Mountains of Queen Maud Land. Mapped from surveys and air photos by the Norwegian Antarctic Expedition (1956–60) and named Plogskaftet (the plow handle).

Rimekalvane Nunataks
Rimekalvane Nunataks (coordinates: 72°3′S 13°38′E) is a group of nunataks 4 nautical miles (7 km) east of Dekefjellrantane Hills in the Weyprecht Mountains of Queen Maud Land. Photographed from the air by the German Antarctic Expedition (1938–39). Mapped by Norwegian cartographers from surveys and air photos by the Norwegian Antarctic Expedition (1956–60) and named Rimekalvane (the frost calves).

Ristkalvane Nunataks
Ristkalvane Nunataks (coordinates: 71°41′S 10°36′E) is a small group of nunataks forming the north end of Shcherbakov Range, in the Orvin Mountains of Queen Maud Land. Discovered and photographed by the German Antarctic Expedition, 1938–39. Mapped by Norway from air photos and surveys by Norwegian Antarctic Expedition, 1956–60, and named Ristkalvane (the ridge calves).

Rokhlin Nunataks
Rokhlin Nunataks (coordinates: 72°12′S 14°28′E) are four nunataks standing 6 nautical miles (11 km) south of Linnormen Hills at the south extremity of the Payer Mountains, in Queen Maud Land. Discovered and first plotted from air photos by German Antarctic Expedition, 1938–39. Mapped from air photos by Norwegian Antarctic Expedition, 1958–59; remapped by Soviet Antarctic Expedition, 1960–61, and named after M.I. Rokhlin, a wintering over geologist who died in 1958.

Filsponen Nunatak (coordinates: 72°12′S 14°25′E) is a nunatak rising northeast of Steinfila Nunatak in the southern part of the Payer Mountains in Queen Maud Land, Antarctica. It was mapped by Norwegian cartographers from surveys and air photos by the Sixth Norwegian Antarctic Expedition (1956–60) and named Filsponen (the filings).
Komandnaya Nunatak (coordinates: 72°12′S 14°31′E) is the eastern and highest of the Rokhlin Nunataks, located in the southern part of the Payer Mountains in Queen Maud Land, Antarctica. It was discovered and plotted from air photos by the Third German Antarctic Expedition, 1938–39. The nunatak was mapped from air photos and surveys collected by the Soviet Antarctic Expedition, 1960–61 and named Gora Komandnaya (Russian for "command mountain").
Skruvestikka Nunatak (coordinates: 72°11′S 14°27′E) is a nunatak just eastward of Filsponen Nunatak at the south end of the Payer Mountains, in Queen Maud Land. Mapped by Norwegian cartographers from air photos taken by the Norwegian Antarctic Expedition (1956–60) and named Skruvestikka (the screwdriver).
Steinfila Nunatak (coordinates: 72°12′S 14°23′E) is the westernmost of Rokhlin Nunataks which mark the southwest extremity of the Payer Mountains in Queen Maud Land. Mapped by Norwegian cartographers from surveys and air photos by the Norwegian Antarctic Expedition (1956–60) and named Steinfila (the stone file).

Sandhøkalvane Nunataks
They were discovered and photographed by the German Antarctic Expedition in 1938–39, and mapped by Norway from air photos and surveys by the Norwegian Antarctic Expedition, 1956–60, and named Sandhøkalvane ("the sand heights calves").

Single nunataks
Båken Nunatak (coordinates: 71°18′S 2°57′W) is a small, isolated nunatak surmounting the north part of Bakeneset Headland in Queen Maud Land. It was mapped by Norwegian cartographers from surveys and from air photos by the Norwegian-British-Swedish Antarctic Expedition (1949–52) (NBSAE), and from air photos by the Norwegian expedition (1958–59), and named "Båken" (the "beacon").
It was discovered by the Third German Antarctic Expedition (1938–1939), led by Capt. Alfred Ritscher, and named after Boreas, one of the Dornier flying boats of the expedition. The feature was surveyed by the NBSAE, led by John Schjelderup Giæver.
It was discovered and plotted from air photos by the Third German Antarctic Expedition, 1938–39. It was mapped from air photos and surveys by the Sixth Norwegian Antarctic Expedition, 1956–60, and remapped by the Soviet Antarctic Expedition, 1960–61. It was named by the USSR as a token of the Soviet scientists' achievements in the study of space, by commemorating Chernushka, a dog that was sent into space and safely returned to earth.
It was mapped by Norwegian cartographers from surveys and air photos by the NBSAE.
It was mapped by Norwegian cartographers from surveys and air photos by the NBSAE and named Dilten.
Drabanten Nunatak (coordinates: 73°54′S 5°55′W) is a nunatak about 10 nautical miles (20 km) west of Tunga Spur, just north of the Kirwan Escarpment in Queen Maud Land. It was mapped by Norwegian cartographers from surveys and air photos by the NBSAE and additional air photos (1958–59), and named Drabanten (the satellite).
It was mapped by the Norsk Polarinstitutt from air photography of 1951–52 and 1958–59. It was also mapped by the Soviet Antarctic Expedition in 1961 and named "Gora Ekspress" (express hill).
It was mapped by Norwegian cartographers in 1957 from air photos taken by U.S. Navy Operation Highjump, 1946–47, and named "Eremitten" (the hermit).
It was mapped by Norwegian cartographers from surveys and air photos by the NBSAE and from air photos by the Norwegian expedition (1958–59) and named Fjomet.
Fløymannen Nunatak (coordinates: 73°9′S 2°14′W) is a nunatak just north of the west end of the Neumayer Cliffs in Queen Maud Land, Antarctica. It was mapped by Norwegian cartographers from surveys and air photos by NBSAE and from air photos by the Norwegian expedition (1958–59) and named Fløymannen (the wing man).
It was mapped by Norwegian cartographers in 1957 from air photos taken by U.S. Navy Operation Highjump, 1946–47, and named Fokknuten (the spray peak).
It was mapped by Norwegian cartographers from surveys and air photos by the NBSAE and named Førstefjell (first mountain).
It was mapped by Norwegian cartographers from surveys and air photos by the NBSAE, and named Førstefjellsrabben (Førstefjell hill) in association with Førstefjell.
It was mapped by Norwegian cartographers from surveys and air photos by the NBSAE and named Framrabben (the forward nunatak).
Galyshev Nunatak (coordinates: 71°36′S 12°28′E) is a nunatak at the southwest foot of Store Svarthorn Peak in the Mittlere Petermann Range of the Wohlthat Mountains, Antarctica. It was discovered and plotted from air photos by the Third German Antarctic Expedition, 1938–39. It was mapped from air photos and surveys by the Sixth Norwegian Antarctic Expedition, 1956–60; remapped by the Soviet Antarctic Expedition, 1960–61, and named after Soviet pilot V.L. Galyshev.
It was mapped and named by Norwegian cartographers from air photos taken by the Sixth Norwegian Antarctic Expedition, 1956–60.
Glopenesranen Nunatak (coordinates: 72°8′S 10°1′E) is a nunatak surmounting the north end of Glopeneset at the south side of Glopeflya Plain in Queen Maud Land, Antarctica. It was photographed from the air by the Third German Antarctic Expedition (1938–39). It was mapped by Norwegian cartographers from surveys and air photos by the Sixth Norwegian Antarctic Expedition (1956–60) and named Glopenesranen (the ravine promontory point).
Gløymdehorten Nunatak (coordinates: 72°7′S 12°11′E) is a nunatak on the west side of Horteriset Dome, just west of the Weyprecht Mountains in Queen Maud Land, Antarctica. It was photographed from the air by the Third German Antarctic Expedition (1938–39). It was mapped by Norwegian cartographers from surveys and air photos by the Sixth Norwegian Antarctic Expedition (1956–60) and named Gløymdehorten.
It was mapped by Norwegian cartographers from surveys and air photos by the NBSAE and from air photos by the Norwegian expedition (1958–59) and named Gråsteinen (the gray stone).
It was mapped from surveys and air photos by the Sixth Norwegian Antarctic Expedition (1956–60) and named for Hans-Martin Henriksen, a meteorological assistant with the expedition (1956–58).
It was mapped by Norwegian cartographers in 1946 from air photos taken by the Lars Christensen Expedition, 1936–37, and in 1957 from air photos taken by U.S. Navy Operation Highjump, 1946–47; it was named Hesteskoen (the horseshoe) by the Norwegians.
It was mapped by Norwegian cartographers from air photos taken by the Lars Christensen Expedition, 1936–37, and named Kista (the chest).
It was mapped by Norwegian cartographers from surveys and air photos by the Norwegian–British–Swedish Antarctic Expedition (1949–52) and air photos by the Norwegian expedition (1958–59) and named Knotten (the knob).
It was mapped from surveys and air photos by the Sixth Norwegian Antarctic Expedition (1956–60) and named for Lars Hochlin, a dog driver and radio operator with the expedition (1956–58).
It was mapped by Norwegian cartographers from surveys and air photos by the Norwegian–British–Swedish Antarctic Expedition (1949–52) and from air photos by the Norwegian expedition (1958–59) and named Marsteinen (the sea stone).
Muller Crest (coordinates: 72°11′S 8°8′E) is a short ridgelike nunatak (2,620 m) marking the southeast extremity of the Filchner Mountains in the Orvin Mountains of Queen Maud Land. Discovered by the German Antarctic Expedition under Ritscher, 1938–39, and named after Johannes Muller, navigation officer of the Deutschland, the ship of the German Antarctic Expedition under Filchner, 1911–12. Remapped from air photos and survey by Norwegian Antarctic Expedition, 1956–60.
Nordtoppen Nunatak (coordinates: 71°29′S 25°14′E) is a nunatak, 1,100 m, standing 16 nautical miles (30 km) north of the Austkampane Hills of the Sor Rondane Mountains. Mapped by Norwegian cartographers in 1946 from air photos taken by the Lars Christensen Expedition, 1936–37, and in 1957 from air photos taken by U.S. Navy Operation Highjump, 1946–47. Named Nordtoppen (the north peak) by the Norwegians because of its position in the group.
Odde Nunatak (coordinates: 72°2′S 10°42′E) is a nunatak on the east side of Glopeflya Plain near the Orvin Mountains. It is the northernmost of a small chain of nunataks, and was mapped by Norwegian cartographers from surveys and air photos during the Norwegian Antarctic Expedition (1956–60), It was named for Odde Gjeruldsen, who was a scientific assistant with the expedition.
Odinokaya Nunatak (coordinates: 71°32′S 6°10′E) is a small, isolated nunatak about 15 nautical miles (28 km) northwest of the Jaren Crags, Muhlig-Hofmann Mountains, in Queen Maud Land. Mapped by Norsk Polarinstitutt from surveys and air photos by Norwegian Antarctic Expedition, 1956–60. Also mapped by the Soviet Antarctic Expedition in 1961 and named Gora Odinokaya (solitary hill).
Okskaya Nunatak (coordinates: 71°58′S 13°47′E) is an elongated nunatak, 2,295 m, at the north end of Rimekalvane Nunataks in the Weyprecht Mountains, Queen Maud Land. It was discovered and plotted from air photos by German Antarctic Expedition (1938–39). mapped from air photos and surveys by Norwegian Antarctic Expedition (1956–60),  remapped by Soviet Antarctic Expedition (1960–61) and named presumedly after the river Oka.
Passat Nunatak (coordinates: 71°18′S 3°55′W) is a nunatak (145 m) nearly 1 nautical mile (1.9 km) northeast of Boreas Nunatak at the mouth of Schytt Glacier in Queen Maud Land. Discovered by the German Antarctic Expedition under Ritscher, 1938–39, and named after Passat, one of the Dornier flying boats of the expedition.
Per Nunatak (coordinates: 71°52′S 7°4′E) is a nunatak lying 4 nautical miles (7 km) northeast of Larsen Cliffs in the Muhlig-Hofmann Mountains, Queen Maud Land. Plotted from surveys and air photos by the Norwegian Antarctic Expedition (1956–60) and named for Per Larsen, steward with Norwegian Antarctic Expedition (1956–57).
Pilten Nunatak is a nunatak in the north part of Gjel Glacier in the Sor Rondane Mountains. Mapped by Norwegian cartographers in 1957 from air photos taken by U.S. Navy Operation Highjump, 1946–47, and named Pilten (the nipper).
Pyramiden Nunatak is a nunatak two nautical miles (3.7 km) east of Knallen Peak, on the east side of the head of Schytt Glacier in Queen Maud Land. Mapped by Norwegian cartographers from surveys and air photos by Norwegian-British-Swedish Antarctic Expedition (NBSAE) (1949–52) and named Pyramiden (the pyramid).
Samoylovich Nunatak is a nunatak near the north end of the Hamarskaftet Nunataks, in the Muhlig-Hofmann Mountains, Queen Maud Land. Mapped by Norsk Polarinstitutt from surveys and air photos by Norwegian Antarctic Expedition, 1956–60. Also mapped by Soviet Antarctic Expedition in 1961 and named for Rudolf Samoylovich, a polar explorer.
Sandneskalven Nunatak is a nunatak located 6 nautical miles (11 km) east of Sandneset Point in the Conrad Mountains in Queen Maud Land. Mapped by Norway from air photos and surveys by Norwegian Antarctic Expedition, 1956–60, and named Sandneskalven (the sand point calf).
It was mapped by Norwegian cartographers from air photos taken by the Lars Christensen Expedition, 1936–37, and named Såta ("the haystack").
Sfinksen Nunatak is a nunatak about 1 mile (1.6 km) south of Pyramiden Nunatak, at the southwest end of Ahlmann Ridge in Queen Maud Land. Mapped by Norwegian cartographers from surveys and air photos by the Norwegian-British-Swedish Antarctic Expedition (NBSAE) (1949–1952), led by John Schjelderup Giæver and named Sfinksen (the sphinx).
Tommeliten Rock  is a nunatak six nautical miles (11 km) east of Lorentzen Peak on the Ahlmann Ridge in Queen Maud Land, Antarctica. It was mapped by Norwegian cartographers from surveys and air photos by NBSAE and air photos by the Norwegian expedition (1958–59) and named Tommeliten (Tom Thumb).
Veslestabben Nunatak is an isolated nunatak standing in the central part of Botnneset Peninsula on the south side of Lutzow-Holm Bay. It was mapped by Norwegian cartographers from air photos taken by the Lars Christensen Expedition, 1936–37, and named Veslestabben, meaning "the little stump."

Victoria Land

Individual nunataks
Carapace Nunatak is a prominent isolated nunatak, the most westerly near the head of Mackay Glacier in Victoria Land, standing 8 nautical miles (15 km) southwest of Mount Brooke where it is visible for a considerable distance from many directions.
Cat Nunatak is midway between Vince Nunatak and Hogback Hill in the southern part of Wilson Piedmont Glacier.
The descriptive name appears on the map of the British Antarctic Expedition of 1910–1913.
The nunatak was visited in 1981–82 by Bradley Field, a geologist with the New Zealand Geological Survey, who suggested the name from the impressive icefalls that drop off at either side of the feature.
Vince Nunatak is near Cat Nunatak in the southern part of Wilson Piedmont Glacier.

Marie Byrd Land 
 Bradley Nunatak is a prominent nunatak standing 10 nautical miles (19 km) southwest of Mount Tidd in the Pirrit Hills.
 Knox Peak is located between Vann Peak and Lackey Ridge at the west end of the Ohio Range.

South America

North America

Greenland

Alabama Nunatak
Alfabet Nunatak
Alfheimbjerg
Anders Jahre Nunatak
Anoritooq
Arnold Escher Land
Bartholin Nunatak
Bernhard Studer Land
Beta Nunatak
Bildsøe Nunataks 
Borgtinderne
Brages Range
Brune Nunataks
C. H. Ostenfeld Nunatak
Cecilia Nunatak
Crown Prince Frederick Range
Panorama Nunatak
Redekammen
Dødemandstoppene
Ejnar Mikkelsen Range
Faraway How
Frederiksborg Nunataks
Garde Nunataks
Grønne Nunatak
Tuborgfondet Land
Gaule Bjerg
Graah Mountains
Grabenland
Gronau Nunataks
Häsi Range (Häsi Bjerge)
Helgoland
Hobbs Land
Holger Kiaer Nunataks
Hvidbjørn Nunataks
J. A. D. Jensen Nunataks
J. L. Mowinckel Land
Jakob Kjøde Bjerg
Jomfruen
Kangerluluk Range
Near Kangerlussuaq Fjord, East Greenland
Kangerlussuaq Tinde
Trekant Nunataks
Knud Ringnes Nunatak
Ledesia Bjerg
Lille Renland
Lindbergh Range
Martin Knudsen Nunataks
Moltke Nunataks 
Nansen Nunataks 
Nils Holgersen Nunataks
Nunatakassak
Nunatarsuaq
Nunatarsuaq (Tasiusaq Bay)
In Odinland
Alukajik
Ensom Majestaet
Ensomme Skraent
Eqaluttusoq
Hammerfaldet
Hustoppen
Ørnen
Pelikanen
Spidstoppen
Tommeltotten
Trillingerne
Tyrs Bjerge
Orsugissap Qaqqarsua
Paatusoq
Pattefjeldene
Paul Stern Land
Peary Nunatak
Petermann Peak
Pic de Gerlache
Porsild Nunatak
Poulsen Nunataks
Prøvestenen
Pyramiden
Queen Louise Land
Carlsbergfondet Land
Eventyrfjelde
Falkonerklippe
Farvel Nunatak
Glückstadt Nunatak
Henius Nunatak
Juel-Brockdorff Nunatak
Kaldbakur
Laub Nunataks
Lembcke Bjerg 
Olsen Nunataks
Paletten
Poulsen Nunataks
Prince Axel Nunataks
Prøvestenen
Punktum
Revaltoppe
Savryggen
Suzanne Nunatak
Syvstjernen
Trekanten
Ymer Nunatak
Rigi Nunatak
Royston Nunataks
Shackleton Bjerg
Skaermen
Skirnir Mountains
In Skoldungen Island
Gedebukken
Pandebrasken
Skuren
Sfinksen
Skraenterne
Slottet
Sortehest
Tavlen
In Thorland
Akuliaruseq
Ansbjerg
Diabastoppen
Skønheden
Strudsen
Thrymheim
Tillit Nunatak
Tuttulikassak
Varde Nunatak
Vindhjørne
Vindue Nunatak
Wager Nunataks
Waltershausen Nunatak 
Wandel Land
Watkins Range
Westfal-Larsen Nunatak
Wiedemann Range
Wilkins Nunataks

United States
Klawatti Peak (Washington)
Packsaddle Island (Alaska)
Pasayten Peak (Washington)

Eurasia

Ireland
Benbulbin

Norway
Lodalskåpa

Russia
Gora Severny Nunatak

Scotland
The following mountains formed as Nunataks during the last ice age:
 Canisp
 Suilven
 Stac Pollaidh

See also
List of islands

References